Edith Burroughs (born 1939) was a pro-bowler who was born in Union Springs, Alabama. She was the seventh child of fourteen born in her family. In 1979, she became the first black person to win a pro bowling tournament in the United States.

References

External links
 https://web.archive.org/web/20110708085818/http://bowlportage.com/Hall%20of%20Fame.htm
 https://web.archive.org/web/20100401115342/http://www.summitcountyusbc.com/triCounty.html
 http://www.ohiowba.com/HOF/Superior%20Performance%20Award%20Recipients.pdf
 https://web.archive.org/web/20091012101709/http://www.summitcountyhof.com/Inductees/1986.htm

1939 births
African-American sportswomen
American ten-pin bowling players
Living people
Sportspeople from Alabama
People from Union Springs, Alabama
21st-century African-American people
20th-century African-American sportspeople